The 1922 Lupeni mine disaster was a coal mining explosion at the Lupeni Coal Mine district in the Jiu Valley of Greater Romania, on April 27, 1922. A total of 82 miners were killed.

Accident
The U.S. based Associated Press reported the news from Romania three days after the explosion, on April 30, 1922, with the dispatch "Upward of 100 persons were killed today in a mine explosion in the Lupeni district of Transylvania. The bodies of 50 victims were completely carbonized while those of others were blown to pieces."

References

Jiu Valley
1922 mining disasters
Mining disasters in Romania
1922 in Romania 
April 1922 events
1922 disasters in Romania